The Platino Award for Best Supporting Actress (Spanish: Premio Platino a la mejor actriz de reparto/Premio Platino a la mejor interpretación femenina de reparto) is one of the Platino Awards, Ibero-America's film awards presented annually by the Entidad de Gestión de Derechos de los Productores Audiovisuales (EGEDA) an the Federación Iberoamericana de Productores Cinematográficos y Audiovisuales (FIPCA). 

It was first presented in 2021, with Spanish actress Nathalie Poza being the first recipient, for her role as Violeta in Rosa's Wedding. Prior to that, supporting female performances were included in the Best Actress category.

In the list below the winner of the award for each year is shown first, followed by the other nominees.

Winners and nominees

2020s

See also
 Goya Award for Best Supporting Actress

References

External links
Official site

Platino Awards
Awards established in 2021
Film awards for supporting actress